A number of legends, parables or pieces of folklore appear in the Quran, often with similar motifs to Jewish and Christian traditions which may pre-date those in the Quran. Some included are the story of Cain and Abel, of Abraham destroying idols, of Solomon's conversation with an ant, the story of the Seven Sleepers of Ephesus, and several stories about Mary, mother of Jesus.

Folklorist Alan Dundes has noted three "folktales" in the Quran that fit the pattern of those included in the Aarne–Thompson classification systems of folklore narratives. Peter G. Bietenholz has also noted legends in the Quran that share themes found in Jewish and Christian legends.

Dispute over origins
The Quran mentions accusations by non-believer contemporaries of Muhammad that many stories in the Quran are fables:
Those who disbelieve say: "This (Quran) is but a fabrication which he (Muhammad) himself has invented, and some others have helped him with it, so they have produced a wrong and a falsehood." They also say: "(It consists of) only fables of the ancients which he has got written. They are being read to him in early mornings and evenings (while people are at home)." Say: "(It is a Book full of knowledge revealing many secrets such as no human being could in any wise discover by himself) He Who knows all the secrets contained in the heavens and the earth sends it down (to teach you some of these secrets and guide you in your life so that you may attain happiness in both worlds). He surely is All-Forgiving, All-Compassionate." (Q.25:4-6)
Muslims (such as Muhittin Akgul writing in Islamicity) do not deny that some stories found in the Quran are from "ancient nations", but insist they are not mythology but "factual", and were not taught to Muhammad by Jews or Christians in his region, but revealed by God and provided to humanity as guidance and "deterrents".

Jewish legends

Cain and Abel
Some narratives appear to reflect Jewish Midrash Tanhuma legends, like the narrative of Cain learning to bury the body of Abel in Surah 5:31. Surah 5:32, when discussing the legal and moral applications to the story of Cain and Abel, is similar to what is found in the Jewish Mishnah tradition:

Jerusalem Talmud, Sanhedrin 4:1 (22a): Whoever destroys a soul, it is considered as if he destroyed an entire world. And whoever saves a life, it is considered as if he saved an entire world."

: Because of that We ordained for the Children of Israel: that whoever kills a person—unless it is for murder or corruption on earth—it is as if he killed the whole of mankind; and whoever saves it, it is as if he saved the whole of mankind. Our messengers came to them with clarifications, but even after that, many of them continue to commit excesses in the land.

Abraham destroys the idols

Surah 21, which tells of Abraham destroying the idols, after which he is delivered by God from being thrown into the fire, parallel a legend found in the Midrash Rabbah.

Solomon and the Valley of the Ants

Legends of the Jews 5: "On one occasion he strayed into the valley of the ants in the course of his wanderings. He heard one ant order all the others to withdraw, to avoid being crushed by the armies of Solomon. The king halted and summoned the ant that had spoken. She told him that she was the queen of the ants, and she gave her reasons for the order of withdrawal. Solomon wanted to put a question to the ant queen, but she refused to answer unless the king took her up and placed her on his hand. He acquiesced, and then he put his question: 'Is there any one greater than I am in all the world?' 'Yes,' said the ant. Solomon: 'Who?' Ant: 'I am.' Solomon: 'How is that possible?' Ant: 'Were I not greater than thou, God would not have led thee hither to put me on thy hand.' Exasperated, Solomon threw her to the ground, and said: 'Thou knowest who I am? I am Solomon, the son of David.' Not at all intimidated, the ant reminded the king of his earthly origin, and admonished him to humility, and the king went off abashed.

Jellinek 150:22: "On another day while sailing over a valley where there were many swarms of ants, Solomon heard one ant say to the others, 'Enter your houses; otherwise Solomon's legions will destroy you.' The king asked why she spoke thus, and she answered that she was afraid [that] if the ants looked at Solomon's legions they might be turned from their duty of praising God, which would be disastrous to them. She added that, being the queen of the ants, she had in that capacity given them the order to retire. Solomon desired to ask her a question; but she told him that it was not becoming for the interrogator to be above and the interrogated below. Solomon thereupon brought her up out of the valley; but she then said it was not fitting that he should sit on a throne while she remained on the ground. Solomon now placed her upon his hand, and asked her whether there was any one in the world greater than he. The ant replied that she was much greater; otherwise God would not have sent him there to place her upon his hand. The king, greatly angered, threw her down, saying, 'Dost thou know who I am? I am Solomon, the son of David!' She answered: 'I know that thou art created of a corrupted drop [compare Ab. iii. 1]; therefore thou oughtest not to be proud.' Solomon was filled with shame, and fell on his face."

: "Until, when they came upon the Valley of Ants, an ant said, 'O ants! Go into your nests, lest Sulaimān (Solomon) and his troops crush you without noticing.' He smiled and laughed at her words, and said, 'My Lord, direct me to be thankful for the blessings you have bestowed upon me and upon my parents, and to do good works that please You. And admit me, by Your grace, into the company of Your virtuous servants.'"

It is necessary to note, however, that the Jewish text of Beth ha-Midrasch by Adolf Jellinek (simply referred to as "Jellinek") was written between 1853 and 1878, about 1200 years after the Quran. Of all the midrashim associated with Solomon, The Episode of the Ant is most directly influenced by the Islamic traditions. While the King’s connection to this small insect might derive from Tanakh (e.g. Proverbs 6:6), the stories told in this narrative seem predominantly, if not exclusively, to come from a Muslim context: Solomon’s dominion over demons, control of the wind, reliance upon Assaf ben Berachiyyah, and confederacy with the vulture are all well attested themes in the Quran and subsequent traditions, yet barely discoverable in a Jewish context. However, these borrowings from Islamic culture ultimately are framed in a very Jewish fashion.

Christian legends
The Quran also contains many references to Apocryphal Christian legends.

The Seven Sleepers
In the Seven Sleepers legend, seven believers from Ephesus seek refuge in a cave from pagans threatening them with death and fall into a miraculous sleep lasting hundreds of years. They awake to find the pagans vanquished and the land converted to their faith. The story fits Aarne-Thompson story type 766.

The earliest version of this story comes from the Syrian bishop Jacob of Serugh (–521), which is itself derived from an earlier Greek source, now lost. An outline of this tale appears in Gregory of Tours (538–594), and in Paul the Deacon's (720–799) History of the Lombards. The best-known Western version of the story appears in Jacobus de Voragine's Golden Legend.
Christians celebrate the "Seven Sleepers of Ephesus" as a miracle and for centuries the Roman church celebrated its feast day on 27 July. 

The Seven Sleepers legend also appears in the Quran, where the sleepers are described as Muslims, and the length of their sleep is given specifically as 309 years; but the threat of death from pagans, the location of the cave, and even the exact number of sleepers are not mentioned.

Mary

Mary was named by her mother
Gospel of James 1,2,5: "In the records of the twelve tribes of Israel was Joachim,...And his wife Anna...And the days having been fulfilled, Anna was purified, and gave the breast to the child, and called her name Mary."

: "The wife of Imran said, 'My Lord, I have vowed to You what is in my womb, dedicated, so accept from me; You are the Hearer and Knower.' And when she delivered her, she said, 'My Lord, I have delivered a female,' and God was well aware of what she has delivered, 'and the male is not like the female, and I have named her Mary,...'"

Mary's miraculous nourishment
Gospel of James 8: "And Mary was in the Temple of the Lord. She was nurtured like a dove, and received food from the hand of an angel."

: "Whenever Zechariah entered upon her in the sanctuary, he found her with provision. He said, 'O Mary, where did you get this from?' She said, 'It is from God; God provides to whom He wills without reckoning.'"

The selection of Mary's guardian by lottery
Gospel of James 9: "...Joseph took his rod last; and, behold, a dove came out of the rod, and flew upon Joseph's head. And the priest said to Joseph, You have been chosen by lot to take into your keeping the virgin of the Lord."

: 'Then her Lord accepted her graciously and blessed her with a pleasant upbringing and placed her in the care of Zechariah [...]'

: "These are accounts from the Unseen, which We reveal to you. You were not with them when they cast their lots as to which of them would take charge of Mary; nor were you with them as they quarreled."

Eating from a palm tree

Gospel of Pseudo-Matthew 20: "And it came to pass on the third day of their journey, while they were walking, that the blessed Mary was fatigued by the excessive heat of the sun in the desert; and seeing a palm tree, she said to Joseph: Let me rest a little under the shade of this tree...Then the child Jesus, with a joyful countenance, reposing in the bosom of His mother, said to the palm: O tree, bend your branches, and refresh my mother with your fruit. And immediately at these words the palm bent its top down to the very feet of the blessed Mary; and they gathered from it fruit, with which they were all refreshed."

: "So she carried him, and secluded herself with him in a remote place. The labor-pains came upon her, by the trunk of a palm-tree. She said, 'I wish I had died before this, and been completely forgotten.' Whereupon he called her from beneath her: 'Do not worry; your Lord has placed a stream beneath you. And shake the trunk of the palm-tree towards you, and it will drop ripe dates by you. So eat, and drink, and be consoled. And if you see any human, say, "I have vowed a fast to the Most Gracious, so I will not speak to any human today."'"

Jesus

Speaking as a baby
Arabic Infancy Gospel 1: "...when He was lying in His cradle said to Mary His mother: I am Jesus, the Son of God, the Logos, whom thou hast brought forth, as the Angel Gabriel announced to thee; and my Father has sent me for the salvation of the world."

: "Then she came to her people, carrying him. They said, 'O Mary, you have done something terrible. O sister of Aaron, your father was not an evil man, and your mother was not a unchaste.' So she pointed to him. They said, 'How can we speak to an infant in the crib?' He said, 'I am the servant of God. He has given me the Scripture, and made me a prophet. And has made me blessed wherever I may be; and has enjoined on me prayer and charity, so long as I live. And kind to my mother, and He did not make me a disobedient rebel. So Peace is upon me the day I was born, and the day I die, and the Day I get resurrected alive.' That is Jesus son of Mary the word of truth about which they doubt."

Clay birds
Infancy Gospel of Thomas 2: "And having made some soft clay, He fashioned out of it twelve sparrows."

: "A messenger to the Children of Israel: 'I have come to you with a sign from your Lord. I make for you out of clay the figure of a bird; then I breathe into it, and it becomes a bird by God's leave...'"

Denial of crucifixion

The view that Jesus only appeared to be crucified, and did not actually die, predates Islam; it is found in several apocryphal gospels.

Irenaeus, in his book Against Heresies, describes Gnostic beliefs that bear remarkable resemblance with the Islamic view:

: "And for their saying, 'We have killed the Messiah, Jesus, the son of Mary, the Messenger of God.' In fact, they did not kill him, nor did they crucify him, but it appeared to them as if they did."

Islamic tradition, similarly, holds that someone else was crucified instead of Jesus. Frequently the substitute is identified as either Judas Iscariot or Simon of Cyrene.

Dhu al-Qarnayn

The Quran alludes to a figure referred to as Dhu al-Qarnayn ("he of the two horns").
The majority of modern researchers of the Qur'an as well as Islamic commentators identify Dhu al-Qarnayn as Alexander the Great. Secular researchers consider the story to be legendary.

The reasoning behind the name "Two-Horned" is somewhat obscure: the scholar al-Tabari (839–923 CE) held it was because he went from one extremity ("horn") of the world to the other, but it may ultimately derive from the image of Alexander wearing the horns of the ram-god Zeus-Ammon, as popularised on coins throughout the Hellenistic Near East. 

The wall Dhu al-Qarnayn builds on his northern journey may have reflected a distant knowledge of the Great Wall of China (the 12th century scholar al-Idrisi drew a map for Roger of Sicily showing the "Land of Gog and Magog" in Mongolia), or of various Sassanid Persian walls built in the Caspian area against the northern barbarians, or a conflation of the two.

Dhu al-Qarnayn also journeys to the western and eastern extremities ("qarns", tips) of the Earth. In the west he finds the sun setting in a "muddy spring", equivalent to the "poisonous sea" which Alexander found in the Syriac legend.  In the Syriac original Alexander tested the sea by sending condemned prisoners into it, but the Quran describes a general administration of justice. In the east both the Syrian legend and the Quran have Alexander/Dhu al-Qarnayn find a people who live so close to the rising sun that they have no protection from its heat.

"Qarn" also means "period" or "century", and the name Dhu al-Qarnayn therefore has a symbolic meaning as "He of the Two Ages", the first being the mythological time when the wall is built and the second the age of the end of the world when Allah's shariah, the divine law, is to be removed and Gog and Magog are to be set loose. Modern Islamic apocalyptic writers, holding to a literal reading, put forward various explanations for the absence of the wall from the modern world, some saying that Gog and Magog were the Mongols and that the wall is now gone, others that both the wall and Gog and Magog are present but invisible.

See also
 Historical reliability of the Quran
 Biblical and Quranic narratives
 Criticism of the Quran

References

Quran
Islamic theology
Quranic narratives